Judith Lewis Herman (born 1942) is an American psychiatrist, researcher, teacher, and author who has focused on the understanding and treatment of incest and traumatic stress.

Herman is Professor of Psychiatry at Harvard Medical School, Director of Training at the Victims of Violence Program in the Department of Psychiatry at the Cambridge Health Alliance in Cambridge, Massachusetts, and a founding member of the Women's Mental Health Collective.

She was the recipient of the 1996 Lifetime Achievement Award from the International Society for Traumatic Stress Studies and the 2000 Woman in Science Award from the American Medical Women's Association. In 2003, she was named a Distinguished Fellow of the American Psychiatric Association.

Career
Judith Herman is best known for her contributions to the understanding of trauma and its victims, as set out in her second book, Trauma and Recovery. There she distinguishes between single-incident traumas – one-off events – which she termed Type I traumas, and complex or repeated traumas (Type II). Type I trauma, according to the United States Veterans Administration's Center for Post Traumatic Stress Disorder, "accurately describes the symptoms that result when a person experiences a short-lived psychological trauma". Type II – the concept of complex post-traumatic stress disorder (CPTSD) – includes "the syndrome that follows upon prolonged, repeated trauma". Although not yet accepted by DSM-IV as a separate diagnostic category, the notion of complex traumas has been found useful in clinical practice, although the eleventh revision of ICD (ICD-11), released in 2018, now includes that diagnosis for the first time.

Herman equally influentially set out a three-stage sequence of trauma treatment and recovery. The first and most important involved the establishment of safety, which might be especially difficult for people in abusive relationships. The second phase involved active work upon the trauma, fostered by that secure base, and employing any of a range of psychological techniques. The final stage was represented by an advance to a new post-traumatic life, possibly broadened by the experience of surviving the trauma and all it involved.

Herman was interviewed by Harry Kreisler, Executive Director of the Institute of International Studies at the University of California at Berkeley, for his ongoing series Conversations with History at the Institute of International Studies, UC Berkeley. She is currently working on a study about the effects of the justice system on victims of sexual violence to discover a better way for victims of crimes to interact with what she perceives as an 'adversarial' system of crime and punishment in the U.S.

Early life 
Judith Herman was born in New York City to Helen Block Lewis, who was a psychologist and psychoanalyst and taught at Yale, and Naphtali Lewis, who worked as a professor of Classics at City University of New York. Judith Herman received her education at Radcliffe College and Harvard Medical School.

Publications

Books

Book chapters 
  Sample pdf.

Articles 
 Harvey, Mary, and Herman, Judith Lewis (September 1994). "Amnesia, Partial Amnesia, and Delayed Recall among Adult Survivors of Childhood Trauma". Consciousness and Cognition 3 (3-4): 295-206. Pdf. 
 
  Sample pdf.

References

External links
 "Justice from the Victim's Perspective" - Lecture given at Wesleyan University, 10 May 2010
 "Conversations with History:  The Case of Trauma and Recovery Psychological Insight and Political Understanding with Judith Herman" - Interview with Harry Kreisler from the University of Berkeley, 30 October 2010

1942 births
Living people
Harvard Medical School faculty
Place of birth missing (living people)
American women psychiatrists
American psychiatrists
Radcliffe College alumni
Harvard Medical School alumni
American women academics
21st-century American women